Tai Aiton can refer to:

Tai Aiton language
Tai Aiton people